Pontus Netterberg (born February 9, 1992) is a Swedish professional ice hockey player currently under contract with the Växjö Lakers of the Swedish Hockey League (SHL).

He has formerly played with HV71 in the Elitserien during the 2010–11 Elitserien season. After four seasons in the lower tiers in Sweden, Netterberg secured his second SHL contract, agreeing to a two-year deal with the Växjö Lakers on April 25, 2016.

Awards and honours

References

External links

1992 births
HV71 players
Living people
Swedish ice hockey forwards
Tingsryds AIF players
Växjö Lakers players
People from Varberg
Sportspeople from Halland County